Gocław is a subdistrict in Praga-Południe, in south-east Warsaw with a population of over 50.000 inhabitants.

Neighbourhoods 
The area of Gocław is divided into six separate neighborhoods (osiedla):
 Iskra
 Jantar
 Orlik
 Wilga
 Kępa Gocławska

References

Neighbourhoods of Praga-Południe